Østre Gausdal is a former municipality in the old Oppland county, Norway. The  municipality existed from 1879 until its dissolution in 1962. The area is now part of Gausdal Municipality. The administrative centre was the village of Segalstad bru.

The main church for the municipality was Østre Gausdal Church, a brick, Romanesque church built during the period 1250–1300. The church was renovated and enlarged in the 1700s.

History
In 1879, the large Gausdal Municipality was divided into two separate municipalities: Vestre Gausdal (population: 2,362) and Østre Gausdal (population: 5,911). Vestre Gausdal Municipality included the larger, more rural parts of the old municipality and Østre Gausdal was much smaller and more densely populated and it was located in the southwestern part of the old municipality. During the 1960s, there were many municipal mergers across Norway due to the work of the Schei Committee. On 1 January 1962, the two municipalities of Vestre Gausdal (population: 2,590) and Østre Gausdal (population: 3,942) were reunited as Gausdal Municipality.

Name
The municipality was named after the historic church parish of Gausdal. The first element of the name comes from the local river name, Gausa and the last element is dalr which means "valley" or "dale". The river name is derived from the verb gjósa which means "stream forcefully". When the large Gausdal Municipality was divided in 1879, the eastern part was given the prefix Østre which means "eastern".

Government
All municipalities in Norway, including Østre Gausdal, are responsible for primary education (through 10th grade), outpatient health services, senior citizen services, unemployment and other social services, zoning, economic development, and municipal roads. The municipality was governed by a municipal council of elected representatives, which in turn elected a mayor.

Municipal council
The municipal council  of Østre Gausdal was made up of representatives that were elected to four year terms.  The party breakdown of the final municipal council was as follows:

See also
List of former municipalities of Norway

References

Gausdal
Former municipalities of Norway
1879 establishments in Norway
1962 disestablishments in Norway